Aleksandar Živković may refer to two footballers:

 Aleksandar Živković (footballer, born 1912), who played 15 times for Yugoslavia and once for Croatia
 Aleksandar Živković (footballer, born 1977), who played twice for FR Yugoslavia